Richard McCormack may refer to:

 Richard T. McCormack, U.S. government official and diplomat
 Richard McCormack (politician) (born 1947), political figure in the state of Vermont